Grand Isle may refer to:

Places 
In the United States:
 Grand Isle, a barrier island on the Gulf Coast, part of Jefferson Parish, Louisiana
 Grand Isle, Louisiana, a town located on the island
 Grand Isle State Park (Louisiana), a park on the island
 Grand Isle, Plaquemines Parish, Louisiana, a small community in the Mississippi River Delta
 Grand Isle, Maine, a town in Maine
 Grand Isle (CDP), Maine, the primary village in the town
 Grand Isle, Vermont, a town in Vermont
 Grand Isle (island), an island in Vermont
 Grand Isle County, Vermont
 Grand Isle State Park (Vermont)

Other uses 
 Grand Isle (1991 film), a film directed by Mary Lambert
Grand Isle (2019 film), a film directed by Stephen Campanelli
 USCGC Grand Isle, a 110 ft Island Class cutter

See also 
 Grandisle, Edmonton, Alberta, Canada
 Grand Island (disambiguation)
 Grande Île (disambiguation)
 Rail Car Grand Isle, an exhibition building at Shelburne Museum in Shelburne, Vermont